The Public and Railway Officers Province was an electorate of the Victorian Legislative Council.

Members of Public and Railway Officers

See also
 Parliaments of the Australian states and territories
 List of members of the Victorian Legislative Council

References

Public and Railway Officers
1904 establishments in Australia
1907 disestablishments in Australia